The 2006 WNBA season was the ninth for the Washington Mystics. The Mystics reached the playoffs, but they were later swept in the opening round to the Connecticut Sun.

Offseason

WNBA Draft

Regular season

Season standings

Season schedule

Playoffs

Player stats

References

External links
Mystics on Basketball Reference

Washington Mystics seasons
Washington
Washington Mystics